Craig Anthony Curry (born July 20, 1961) is a former American football defensive back in the National Football League. He played for the Tampa Bay Buccaneers and Indianapolis Colts. He played college football for the Texas Longhorns.

References

1961 births
Living people
Players of American football from Houston
American football defensive backs
Texas Longhorns football players
Tampa Bay Buccaneers players
Indianapolis Colts players
National Football League replacement players